The 2001 FIA GT Silverstone 500 km was the fourth round the 2001 FIA GT Championship season.  It took place at the Silverstone Circuit, Great Britain, on May 13, 2001.

Official results
Class winners in bold.  Cars failing to complete 70% of winner's distance marked as Not Classified (NC).

Statistics
 Pole position – #3 Team Carsport Holland – 1:48.575
 Fastest lap – #1 Lister Storm Racing – 1:49.625
 Average speed – 158.860 km/h

References

 
 

S
FIA GT
May 2001 sports events in the United Kingdom